Tarek Wafik Mohamed is an Egyptian urban planner and former minister of housing during the Qandil Cabinet. He was the first housing minister of Egypt who is a specialist in urban development.

Education
Wafik studied architecture at Cairo university. He received a PhD in natural resources and planning from the University of Colorado.

Career
Wafik is an urban planning professional and economics expert. He served as an urban planning professor at Cairo University. He also dealt with business activities and headed the Eco Plan Consulting, a private firm based in Giza. He is a member of the Freedom and Justice Party (FJP) and also, a member of the party's high board. Wafik developed the regional and urban dimensions of the Muslim Brotherhood's the Renaissance Project and is head of the FJP's internal housing committee. He is also one of the members of the Engineers Syndicate after the Muslim Brotherhood won the majority of its seats. He headed the housing portfolio during Morsi's presidential campaign. 

He was appointed minister of housing in August 2012, replacing Fathi El Baradie. He was one of the FJP members serving in the Qandil cabinet. Wafik's term ended on 16 July 2013 when the interim government led by Hazem Al Beblawi was formed.

References

Living people
University of Colorado alumni
Cairo University alumni
Academic staff of Cairo University
Housing ministers of Egypt
Qandil Cabinet
Freedom and Justice Party (Egypt) politicians
Year of birth missing (living people)